Jan Kok may refer to:

 Jan Kok (footballer), medalist at the 1908 Olympics
 Jan Kok (pharmacist), professor and rector magnificus of the University of Amsterdam